RiverPines Golf is a public golf facility located in Johns Creek, Georgia north of Atlanta, Georgia.

Establishment
RiverPines Golf opened in the fall of 1990 as a 9 hole par 3 course and driving range. In the fall of 1992, RiverPines opened the 18 hole championship golf course designed by Denis Griffiths. It plays to a yardage of 6600 yards and a par of 70. The facility has an instructional program featuring top 100 Golf Magazine instructor Mike Perpich. In addition to the golfing facilities, RiverPines has a pro shop with brands such as Titleist and Callaway as well as a bar/grill area known as the Shadetree Grill.

References

External links 
 RiverPinesGolf.com
 MikePerpich.com
 Atlanta Golf Pictures

Golf clubs and courses in Georgia (U.S. state)
Buildings and structures in Fulton County, Georgia
Tourist attractions in Fulton County, Georgia
Johns Creek, Georgia